The BMW M47 and Rover Group M47R are straight-4 Diesel engines. Variants were manufactured by BMW from 1998 to 2007. BMW gradually adopted high-pressure common rail fuel injection systems over the lifetime of the M47.

M47D20

The original M47 diesel engine featured non-common-rail direct fuel injection and a  block. All M47 engines have one Swirl and one Tangential intake port per cylinder, which can each improve performance under different conditions. These features are not to be confused with swirl flaps, which were introduced in the M47D20TÜ.

Applications:
  and 
 2001–2003 E46 318d
  and 
 1999–2001 E46 320d
 2000–2003 E39 520d

M47R

Rover Group (UK) and Steyr (Austria), worked together to modify the M47D20 to create a transverse configuration for use in the Rover 75 front wheel drive saloon, as well as their all-wheel-drive Land Rover Freelander. The same engine was later deployed by MG Rover in the Rover 75 Tourer and MG ZT. The M47R ("M47 Rail") differs from the original design by the introduction of common-rail technology, a transverse orientation, different turbochargers and more sophisticated systems for temperature management. However, the core  heads of the M47R and M47D20 are the same. Combining a common-rail system with a relatively small engine capacity created engine temperature problems. More hardware was added to help control temperatures which also helped to escalate weight, fuel consumption, and manufacturing costs. The BMW Steyr plant manufactured and supplied M47R engines with the same power output as the M47D20 from 1999 to 2006.

Applications:
 1999–2004 Rover 75 CDT
 1999–2005 Rover 75 CDTi
 2001–2006 Land Rover Freelander
 2001–2004 MG ZT CDT
 2001–2005 MG ZT CDTi

M47D20TÜ

The all wheel drive BMW X3 and rear-wheel drive BMW 320d models, built approximately between September 2001 and December 2004, were fitted with the M47TÜ ("M47 Technical Update"). The exact production week is not known and was probably later than Production Week 33 in 2001 (e.g. one cannot rely on a UK 51 plate registered BMW 320d to have the M47TU).

These changes empowered BMW to increase torque and improve fuel consumption, especially at lower revs. However, these modifications added  to overall weight and emissions raised accordingly. In the UK, the new characteristics of the M47TÜ were sufficient to lift the BMW 320d into the next highest insurance bracket, and the next highest band for Vehicle Excise Duty (Road Tax).

The M47TÜ was regarded as so good that BMW made it available in the 320Cd Coupé.

The M47D20TÜ introduced new common failure points. Chief among these was a new 'swirl flap' mechanism embedded in the inlet manifold. This consisted of a number of butterfly valves within each individual inlet tract, which are secured to an actuating rod via two small screws. It has become clear that over time these screws can come loose via vibration etc. When this happens they can end up being drawn into the respective cylinder, causing significant damage to the piston, cylinder head, and valves. If unlucky further damage can be caused to the turbo if the screw then makes its way through the exhaust valve into the manifold and subsequently into the turbo. These failures have occurred in such quantity that a number of specialist BMW magazines have featured articles on the problem including information on how to remove the swirl flaps.  For those who wish to perform some preventive maintenance on the M47TUD20 engine, there are companies who supply and/or fit blanking plugs to allow the removal of these swirl flaps altogether. BMW addressed the problem by introducing stronger swirl flaps and larger diameter spindles – made from plastic – in 2006.

Applications:
  and 
 2003–2005 E46 318d
  and 
 2001–2005 E46 320d
 E83 X3 2.0d (up to end of 2006)

M47D20TÜ2

The engine was updated again in 2004 as the M47D20TÜ2 (for Technische Überarbeitung 2 = second revision).

Applications:
  and 
 E87 118d
 E90/E91 318d
  and 
 E60/E61 520d
 E87 120d
 E90/E91 320d
 E83 X3 2.0d (end of 2006 onwards)

See also
 List of BMW engines

References

External links 
 The UnixNerd's BMW M47 engine page with photos, history and common problems.

M47
Diesel engines by model

Straight-four engines